Dead Sands is a Bahraini multi-lingual horror-comedy film currently under production and directed by Ameera Al Qaed and produced by Zeeshan Jawed Shah, Ameera Al Qaed, Ahmed Zayani, and Noor Al Ebrahim, starring various debuting actors. The screenplay is written by Ahmed Zayani. The film is widely regarded as being the first zombie film produced in Bahrain. The film is sponsored by Ahmed Zayani and Sons,  Bahrain Cinema Company, and NYIT Bahrain, Dead Sands' media sponsor is local youth magazine  CoEds and Daily Tribune.

Plot 
In the wake of a viral outbreak throughout Bahrain, a group of strangers become acquainted with each other when they realize that they must unite to ward off the undead plague.

Cast 
Şenay Dincsoy as May
Miraya Varma as Samara
Bu Idrees Mughal as Wolf
Abdulwahab Basil as Friday
Aysha Burashid as Dahlia
Nujood Al Mahmood as Dr. Farah
Ahmed Al-Qaed as Abdulrahman
Heba Hisham as Reem
Mahdi Rafea as Mahdi
Emad Al-Jeri as Fahad
Baraa Abdulla as Baraa
Noor Nooruddin as Sara
Saleh Al-Derazi as Jamal
Ahmed Zayani as TJ
Mohammed Zayani as Damien
Mohammed Junaid as Junaid
Lubna Hussain Kazmi as Lana
Mohammed Zubari as Jassim
Zeeshan Jawed Shah as Aslam
Omar Ashraf
Noora Khan as Sana
Saleh Al-Saati as Salman
Anne Mary as Tooms
Mila K. Killer as Mila
Maha Al Zaidy as Girl in the Umm Hamar part
Alex as Alex
Yousaf Zarka as Joe

References

External links 
 
 

2013 films
Films set in Bahrain
Films shot in Bahrain
Articles containing video clips
Bahraini zombie films
Parodies of horror